This is an incomplete list of paintings by the British artist John Sell Cotman.

Attributed works

Works

Footnotes

References

British paintings
Cotman, John Sell